"Margate" is a song from the album Job Lot by Chas & Dave. It was released as a single on 11 July 1982 and entered the UK Singles Chart at number 67. The song stayed in the charts for 4 weeks and peaked at number 46 on 24 July 1982.

Composition
As depicted in the accompanying video, the song is about a coach trip to the traditional seaside attractions of Margate in Kent. Unusually, the verse and chorus are in different keys (D major and G major respectively).

The song was used in a series of adverts for Courage Best Bitter, however, unlike other Chas & Dave songs also used for other Courage adverts, the song was written specifically for the advert first.  The advertising agency requested that Chas & Dave write a song for their adverts using the tune from the chorus of their song "Massage Parlour", but with lyrics about a trip to Margate.  The advert proved popular, and Chas & Dave then wrote the full lyrics for the song, recorded and released it as a single.

B-side
In a contrasting style the B-side Give it Gavotte is an instrumental, based on the Gavotte folk dance style from France.

In other media
It is used in the popular Only Fools & Horses episode "The Jolly Boys' Outing" (1989) with minor lyric changes from the single version and the voices of David Jason and Nicholas Lyndhurst added.

Charts

See also 
 Chas & Dave discography

References

1982 singles
Chas & Dave songs
Kent in fiction
Margate
Novelty songs
1982 songs